The Hyolithida are lophophorates, one of the two orders of hyolithid, the other being the Orthothecida. Most of our knowledge of the hyolithids comes from studies on the Hyolithida. Both orders had an operculum that was not hinged to the conch. However, the Hyolithida are distinct from the Orthothecida in having additional paired, curved, whiskerlike appendages. The Hyolithida were probably bottom feeders living in shallow water, and had tentacules.

References

Further reading
 
 

Paleozoic invertebrates
Prehistoric animal orders
Hyolitha